Sir Anthony Babington (1561–1586) was an English plotter.

Anthony Babington may also refer to:
 Sir Anthony Babington (Nottingham MP) (1476–1536), MP for Nottingham
 Sir Anthony Babington (judge, born 1877) (1877–1972), Irish barrister, judge and politician
 Anthony Babington (author) (1920–2004), British Croix de Guerre recipient, author, judge, historian, and campaigner

See also
 Anthony Babington Wilson (born 1931) Anglo-Irish former business executive, artist and author